Lukáš Hlavatovič (born 22 April 1987) is a professional Slovak footballer who currently plays for II. Liga club Skalica as a defender.

References

External links
 
 Futbalnet profile
 Eurofotbal profile

1987 births
Living people
Slovak footballers
Association football defenders
FC Spartak Trnava players
MŠK Novohrad Lučenec players
ŠK Senec players
MFK Skalica players
Slovak Super Liga players
Sportspeople from Trnava
2. Liga (Slovakia) players